Admiral Sir Hugh Justin Tweedie KCB (5 April 1877 – 20 August 1951) was an officer in the Royal Navy who served in the First and Second World War.

Naval career
Tweedie was born at Charlton, Kent, the son of General Michael Tweedie of the Royal Artillery, and his wife Louisa Bateson Hammond. He joined the Royal Navy in 1891. On Rodney he undertook a course on mine warfare. His instructor was Robert Falcon Scott.

At the time of the Diamond Jubilee Review in 1897, Tweedie was appointed to the destroyer . He then served on the cruiser  at the Cape. Promoted to lieutenant he received his first command, the governor's paddle yacht Countess of Derby for an operation on the Bumpeh River in Sierra Leone. There had been an uprising due to the imposition of Hut tax. He was tasked to transport a detachment of troops up the river to attack the rebel position. The detachment managed to get lost and Tweedie led a second native militia in a successful operation against the rebel position.

Tweedie's next posting was the destroyer , the cruiser  and then the new battleship  in China.

Tweedie's next command as captain was the cruiser  in Mexico at time of United States occupation of Veracruz. He was sent by Admiral Cradock from Veracruz with a small party to take despatches through the rebel lines to Mexico City. He returned with some one hundred American refugees for which he was thanked by President Woodrow Wilson. Essex then steamed to Canada. Essex was three hours away at full steam only to arrive in time to pick up bodies as Empress of Ireland had sunk. In Canada Tweedie spent sometime as aide-de-camp to the Governor General of Canada, the Duke of Connaught.

Tweedie's next command in 1915 was the monitor  which was being built in Jarrow. The ship was nearly destroyed before it was launched in a Zeppelin raid on the town. Tweedie's wife Constance launched the ship. A monitor, is a shallow draught barge with a large gun turret mounted on top. The ship turned out to be very difficult. She was designed to make  though she never much exceeded . Her diesel engines were unreliable. She saw action off the Belgium coast bombarding German positions with her  guns. In 1916, Tweedie was appointed to another monitor, seeing action in the Mediterranean Sea around Salonica and the Dardanelles.

In 1917 Tweedie returned to Rosyth. He was promoted to Commodore of the Grand Fleet Flotillas, a command of some 150 ships, under Admiral Beatty. It fell to him at the end of hostilities to lead out all his destroyer flotillas to meet the German High Seas Fleet and escort them into the Firth of Forth. This was quite a feat of seamanship. The destroyer flotillas were to be  ahead of the main British fleet. The German destroyers were then escorted back to Rosyth, altogether a total of 170 ships. He was made a Commander of the Order of the Bath (CB) in 1919.

After the First World War, Tweedie was involved with the coastguard. In 1922 he commanded the battleship  in the Mediterranean during the Chanak Crisis. In 1923 he had a shore job as director of training. In 1926 he was promoted to rear admiral and Senior Naval Officer on the Yangtze River, China. China was in a state of upheaval with war lords, communists and pirates operating on the river.

Tweedie was promoted to vice admiral and Commander-in-Chief Africa Station in 1930. His command stretched from the Cape of Good Hope up both the east and west coasts of Africa to the equator. HMS Calcutta cruised each coast twice a year. In 1933 he was Commander-in-Chief, The Nore and was knighted KCB. He was promoted to admiral in 1935.

Tweedie retired from the navy in 1936 and in 1939 published his autobiography. However, he was recalled at the outbreak of the Second World War.

Tweedie served as Deputy Lieutenant and J.P. He died in 1951 at the age of 74.

Tweedie married Constance Marion Crossman in 1907 in Japan. They had three sons and four daughters. Michael who was killed 1937 serving in the Guides Cavalry. Hugo who followed his fathers into the navy was awarded DSC 1942 as commander of HMS Tynedale during the St Nazaire Raid.  Vere Tweedie who served in the Gold Coast Regiment of Royal West African Frontier Force awarded MC in 1945 during an action behind Japanese lines on the Tamandu to An road in the Arakan Burma.

References

 Tweedie, Admiral Hugh. "The Story of a Naval Life", Rich & Cowan (1936)

|-

1877 births
1951 deaths
Royal Navy officers of World War I
Royal Navy admirals of World War II
Knights Commander of the Order of the Bath
Recipients of the Order of the Rising Sun
Officiers of the Légion d'honneur
People from Charlton, London
Deputy Lieutenants in England
Military personnel from Kent
Members of Trinity House